The following is the 1950–51 network television schedule for the four major English language commercial broadcast networks in the United States. The schedule covers primetime hours from September 1950 through March 1951. The schedule is followed by a list per network of returning series, new series, and series cancelled after the 1949–50 season. This season became the first in which primetime was entirely covered by the networks. It was also the inaugural season of the Nielsen rating system. Late in the season, the coast-to-coast link was in service.

In September 1950 NBC added two live variety series, Four Star Revue and The Colgate Comedy Hour, to its fall schedule. These programs were a network effort to bring NBC's most popular radio stars to television; talent included Eddie Cantor, Jack Carson, Dean Martin and Jerry Lewis, Jimmy Durante, Danny Thomas, Ed Wynn, Bob Hope and Fred Allen. The two new star-studded series were scheduled directly against two of CBS's most popular programs: Four Star Revue went up against Arthur Godfrey and Friends on Wednesday nights, while The Colgate Comedy Hour was slated against Toast of the Town. NBC was confident that its strategy would pay off.

CBS answered NBC's schedule with big radio stars and variety programs of its own, bringing in Frank Sinatra and (in occasional specials) Bing Crosby, Jack Benny, and Edgar Bergen. "Despite the big budget variety shows in its schedule, though, CBS felt that situation comedy was actually a more stable television form that would be easier to exploit in the long run."

In many time slots, the underfunded DuMont Network did not bother to compete against NBC's or CBS's hit series, instead airing what some TV historians have called "time-filler". For example: "During its long run [The Johns Hopkins Science Review] was scheduled against such hit shows as Break the Bank [and] Dragnet, programs from which its network had little chance of luring away viewers." During fall 1950, The Court of Current Issues and The Johns Hopkins Science Review' aired at the same time as the most heavily viewed program on television, NBC's Texaco Star Theater. Given the competition, DuMont's Tuesday night public-affairs programming attracted virtually no audience. The network had some success with a crime drama that had debuted in January the previous season titled Inside Detective (later retitled Rocky King Detective), which became one of the longest-running series on the network. Another DuMont series to debut during the season, Star Time, while short-lived, is remembered for including a television version of the popular radio sketches The Bickersons, and for being an early example of a sponsored network series to feature an African-American as a regular (jazz pianist Teddy Wilson, a familiar member of the Benny Goodman Sextet).

New fall series are highlighted in bold.

Legend

 Sunday 

Note: On CBS, beginning in January, The Jack Benny Program aired as occasional specials once every six to eight weeks.

Hopalong Cassidy (9/39.9) aired on NBC from 6:00 to 7:00 p.m. The Bigelow Theatre aired on CBS from 6:00 to 6:30 p.m. from December 1950 to June 1951.

 Monday 

 Tuesday 

 Wednesday 

 Thursday 

 Wayne King was seen only on NBC's Midwest Network.

 Friday 

 Saturday Notes: On CBS, Big Top aired from 6:30 to 7:30 p.m. Eastern Time from September 1950 to January 6, 1951, after which it moved to Saturdays from noon to 1:00 p.m., where it ran for another seven years. Faye Emerson's Wonderful Town began on June 16, 1951, and concluded its 42-episode run at 9 p.m. on April 12, 1952.

By network

ABCReturning SeriesActors Studio
Author Meets the Critics
Blind Date
Buck Rogers
Celebrity Time
Club Seven
Crusade in Europe
Dick Tracy
Holiday Hotel
Hollywood Screen Test
Life Begins at Eighty
The Lone Ranger
The Marshall Plan in Action
News and Views
On Trial
Paul Whiteman's Goodyear Revue
Paul Whiteman's TV Teen Club
Photoplay Time
Roller Derby
The Ruggles
Sit or Miss
Soapbox Derby Theater
Stop the Music
Studs's Place
Twenty Questions
Wrestling from the Rainbo in Chicago
Youth on the MarchNew SeriesAfter the Deadlines *The Beulah ShowThe Billy Rose ShowCan You Top This?Chance of a LifetimeThe College BowlDon McNeill's TV ClubFaith Baldwin Romance Theatre *Feature FilmFirst NighterThe Game of the WeekHollywood Premiere TheatreI Cover Times SquareLife with LinkletterLife with the ErwinsPenthouse PartyPro Football HighlightsPulitzer Prize PlayhouseSandy DreamsShowtime U.S.A.Treasury Men in ActionNot returning from 1949–50:ABC Barn Dance
ABC Penthouse Players
Actors Studio
Auction-Aire
The Boris Karloff Mystery Playhouse
Crusade in Europe
Fun for the Money
Let There Be Stars
Little Revue
Majority Rules
Mama Rosa
Mr. Black
Mysteries of Chinatown
News and Views
Oboler Comedy Theater
Photocrime
Photoplay Time
Stained Glass Windows
Starring Boris Karloff
Think Fast
Tomorrow's Boxing Champions
Volume One
Your Witness

CBSReturning SeriesThe Alan Young Show
Arthur Godfrey and His Friends
Arthur Godfrey's Talent Scouts
Beat the Clock
Big Top
CBS Television News
Celebrity Time
The Faye Emerson Show
Ford Theater
The Fred Waring Show
The Garry Moore Show
The Gene Autry Show
The Goldbergs
Joey Faye's Frolics
The Ken Murray Show
Mama
Man Against Crime
Our Miss Brooks
Pabst Blue Ribbon Bouts
The Show Goes On
Starlight Theatre
The Stork Club
Suspense
This Is Show Business
Toast of the Town
We Take Tour Word
The Web
The Week in Review
What's My Line?New SeriesThe Ad-Libbers *Big TownThe Bigelow Theatre *Casey, Crime PhotographerCharlie Wild, Private Detective *DangerFaye Emerson's Wonderful Town *The Frank Sinatra ShowThe George Burns and Gracie Allen ShowThe Horace Heidt ShowIt's News to MeThe Jack Benny ProgramThe Lux Video TheatreMagnavox TheatreThe Nash Airflyte TheaterThe Perry Como ShowPrudential Family PlayhouseRacket Squad *Star of the FamilySure as FateTruth or ConsequencesThe Vaughn Monroe ShowWho's Whose *Not returning from 1949–50:54th Street Revue
Abe Burrows' Almanac
The Bigelow Show
The Black Robe
Blues by Bargy
Capitol Cloak Room
Detective's Wife
Earl Wrightson at Home
The Ed Wynn Show
Escape
The Front Page
Inside U.S.A. with Chevrolet
Lucky Pup
The Paul Arnold Show
People's Platform
Premiere Playhouse
The Roar of the Rails
Romance
Ruthie on the Telephone
The Silver Theatre
The Sonny Kendis Show
Stage 13
The Stage Door
Starlight Theatre
The Ted Steele Show
Television Theatre
To the Queen's Taste
Tonight on Broadway
The Trap
Uptown Jubilee
The Week in Sports
Your Sports Special

DuMontReturning seriesThe Al Morgan Show
The Armed Forces Hour (moved from NBC)
The Arthur Murray Party
Broadway to Hollywood
Captain Video and His Video Rangers
Cavalcade of Bands
Cavalcade of Stars
Country Style
Famous Jury Trials
Georgetown University Forum
Hands of Murder
The Hazel Scott Show
The Joan Edwards Show
Johnny Olson's Rumpus Room
Manhattan Spotlight
Okay, Mother
The Plainclothesman
Rhythm Rodeo
Rocky King, Inside Detective
They Stand Accused
Starlit Time
Visit with the Armed Forces
Wrestling from Columbia Park ArenaNew seriesThe Adventures of Ellery QueenDuMont Royal Theater *Hold That CameraLadies Before Gentlemen *Major Dell Conway of the Flying Tigers *The Most Important PeopleNot for Publication *Once Upon a TuneOur Secret Weapon: The TruthRhythm RodeoSaturday Night at the GardenShadow of the Cloak *Star TimeThe Susan Raye ShowWhat's the Story *With This Ring *Your Story TheatreNot returning from 1949–50:Adventure Playhouse
Amanda
And Everything Nice
Bowling Headliners
Chicagoland Mystery Players
Cinema Varieties
Country Style
Court of Current Issues
Dinner Date with Vincent Lopez
Easy Aces
The Family Genius
Feature Theater
Fishing and Hunting Club
Front Row Center
Manhattan Spotlight
Newsweek Views the News
The O'Neills
Starlit Time
The Vincent Lopez Show
Windy City Jamboree

NBCReturning SeriesThe Aldrich Family
Armstrong Circle Theatre
Bonny Maid Versatile Varieties
Break the Bank
Camel News Caravan
Cameo Theatre
Candid Camera
The Clock
Duffy's Tavern
Fireside Theatre
Garroway at Large
Gillette Cavalcade of Sports
Greatest Fights of the Century
The Halls of Ivy
Hawkins Falls
The Jack Carter Show
Kay Kyser's Kollege of Musical Knowledge
Kraft Television Theatre
Kukla, Fran and Ollie
Leave It to the Girls
Lights Out
The Little Show
Martin Kane, Private Eye
The Mohawk Showroom
One Man's Family
The Original Amateur Hour
Quiz Kids
The Philco Television Playhouse
Robert Montgomery Presents
Screen Directors Playhouse
The Texaco Star Theater
The Voice of Firestone
The Wayne King Show
We, the People
Who Said That?
Your Hit Parade
Your Show of ShowsNew SeriesThe Colgate Comedy HourFour Star RevueThe Hank McCune ShowHenry Morgan's Great Talent Hunt *The Jack Benny ProgramThe Kate Smith Evening HourMusical Comedy TimeRobert Montgomery PresentsSaturday Roundup *Seven at Eleven *Short Story Playhouse *Somerset Maugham TV TheatreThe Speidel Show *Stars Over HollywoodThe Straw Hat Matinee *Tag the Gag *Take a ChanceWatch Mr. Wizard *You Bet Your LifeYour Hit Parade *Not returning from 1949–50:'''The Black RobeChevrolet Tele-TheaterCities Service Band of AmericaThe CrisisFireball Fun-For-AllHopalong CassidyLeon Pearson and the NewsThe Marshal of Gunsight PassMary Kay and JohnnyMasterpiece PlayhouseMeet the PressMeet Your CongressMixed DoublesThe Nature of ThingsTheatre of the MindNote: The * indicates that the program was introduced in midseason.

References

 McNeil, Alex. Total Television. Fourth edition. New York: Penguin Books. .
 Brooks, Tim & Marsh, Earle (1964). The Complete Directory to Prime Time Network TV Shows'' (3rd ed.). New York: Ballantine. .

United States primetime network television schedules
United States network television schedule
United States network television schedule